Enter the Ninja is a 1981 American martial arts film directed by Menahem Golan and starring Franco Nero, Susan George, Sho Kosugi and Christopher George. The film is about a martial artist named Cole (Nero) who is visiting his friend Frank in the Philippines. On arrival, Cole learns that his friend is being harassed by the wealthy businessman Charles Venarius who wants Frank's land for the oil underneath. Frank and his wife are continuously thwarted by Cole who defends them with his martial arts skills. Learning of Cole's presence, Venarius hires his own ninja (Kosugi).

The film was originally intended to be directed by Emmett Alston and to star Mike Stone. Early in the production, Alston was replaced by Golan but stayed on as 2nd unit director, and Stone was replaced with Nero, but stayed on as fight double and fight/stunt coordinator. Since its release, Enter the Ninja attracted a cult following. The film began a craze of ninja-themed Hollywood films during the early 1980s and was the first film in Cannon Films' Ninja Trilogy, an anthology series which includes Revenge of the Ninja (1983) and Ninja III: The Domination (1984). The film launched the career of Sho Kosugi, who went on to play the leading role in both the film's sequels, while also starring in other 1980s ninja-themed films and television shows such as The Master (1984).

Plot
Cole, a mercenary and veteran of the Angolan Bush War, completes his ninjutsu training in Japan. Cole goes to visit his war buddy Frank Landers and his newlywed wife Mary Ann Landers, who are the owners of a large piece of farming land in the Philippines. Cole soon finds that the Landers are being repeatedly harassed by Charles Venarius, the wealthy CEO of Venarius Industries, in order to get them to sell their property because, unbeknownst to them, a large oil deposit is located beneath their land. Cole thwarts the local henchmen Venarius has hired to bully and coerce the Landers.

Cole and Frank infiltrate Venarius' base, and defeat a number of his henchmen. In the aftermath, Frank gets drunk and confesses to Cole that he is impotent. Mary Ann comes to Cole that night and they have an affair. Venarius, learning that Cole is a ninja, hires a ninja of his own to eliminate Frank and Cole - Hasegawa, who is a rival of Cole from their old training days.

Hasegawa strikes the Landers' estate at night, killing Frank in front of Mary Anne, then abducting her to Venarius' martial arts arena. Cole enters, and picks off the henchmen one by one before ultimately killing Venarius.  Hasegawa releases Mary Ann, and the two ninja engage in a final battle. Cole defeats Hasegawa, who begs to be allowed to die with honor, Cole agrees and kills him.

Cast
 Franco Nero as Cole
 Susan George as Mary-Ann Landers  
 Sho Kosugi as Hasegawa  
 Christopher George as Charles Venarius  
 Alex Courtney as Frank Landers  
 Will Hare as "Dollars"  
 Zachi Noy as Siegfried "The Hook" Schultz  
 Constantine Gregory as Mr. Parker (credited as Constantin de Goguel)  
 Dale Ishimoto as Komori  
 Joonee Gamboa as Mr. Mesuda  
 Leo Martinez as "Pee Wee"  
 Ken Metcalfe as Elliot  
 Subas Herrero as Alberto  
 Alan Amiel as Maroon Ninja  
 Doug Ivan as Maroon Ninja

Production
Enter the Ninja was based on an original story that Mike Stone presented to Menahem Golan of Cannon Films, who became involved in the production in late fall 1980, with the intent of creating an American film about ninjutsu.  Metro-Goldwyn-Mayer (MGM) produced the film for $4 million, as part of a multi-project film and television deal with The Cannon Group. The film was initially set to star Karate champion Mike Stone, who wrote the script.

Principal photography began on January 12, 1981, in the Philippines and in Tokyo, Japan, under the direction of Emmett Alston. Shooting began in Manila in February but Golan replaced Alston as director and Franco Nero replaced Stone in the lead role. Stone received onscreen credit for the film's story, fight choreography, and stunt coordination. Principal photography concluded in March.

Release
Cannon planned to screen the film at the Cannes Film Festival, which was followed by promotional material stating the film would be released during the Easter season in 1982. In August 1981, the film opened in Germany and France. The film also played in Arizona in October the same year. The film opened in Los Angeles on April 30, 1982.

Legacy
After the release of Enter the Ninja there was boom of ninja-related films in the early 1980s. The film's antagonist, played by Sho Kosugi, became more popular than the protagonist played by Franco Nero, which led to Enter the Ninja launching Kosugi's career.

Before the film's release, Golan was going to direct a sequel titled Revenge of the Ninja. He was later replaced by Sam Firstenberg as director, while Kosugi was cast in the leading role. The film was released in 1983. The final film in the series was Ninja III: The Domination, which was released in 1984.

Home media
The film was released on VHS in the 1980s. Kosugi had become popular by the time of its release, which led to Kosugi replacing Nero on the VHS cover. The film was also released on Betamax during the 1980s, but an official US DVD release had long eluded the masses until MGM issued it as part of its Limited Edition Collection (a series of manufactured-on-demand DVD-Rs) in October 2011. The film was released on Blu-ray by Kino Lorber on May 26, 2015, and in a box set from Eureka Video as The Ninja Trilogy with Revenge of the Ninja and Ninja III: The Domination on January 18, 2016.

Reception
In a contemporary review, Robert Brown of the Monthly Film Bulletin gave the film a negative review, stating that it "seems singularly lacking in even the commercial ingredients that made Enter the Dragon such a successful showcase for the Kung Fu genre". Brown commented that Golan "never seems to have decided which genre he was exploiting, and ended up mistakenly crossing romantic drama with martial arts". A review by Hubert Niogret in the French film magazine Positif found the film's only purpose was to create a commercial project that was only popular for less demanding audiences and was only popular in the summer in France where there was little competition for quality cinema. Richard Harrington of The Washington Post wrote that the "plot limps along looking for convenient excuses for Ninjas to enter into brawls", noting that "none of the reasoning, acting or dialogue is particularly bright much less believable" while "the best directing in the film comes from fight choreographer and ex-karate champion Mike Stone, who obviously gets his kicks in".

From a retrospective review, Donald Guarisco of AllMovie stated that film was a "pretty lackluster affair". Guarisco also commented on Franco Nero that it "looks uncomfortable as the ninja expert and fails to perform convincingly during the fight scenes" and that Susan George was wasted as the damsel in distress. Although noting a large amount of fighting scenes in the film, he felt that they did not have skillful choreography and sharp editing to make them visceral for the film.

On Metacritic the film has a weighted average score of 35 out of 100, based on 5 critics, indicating "generally unfavorable reviews".

See also
 List of American films of 1981
 List of martial arts films

Notes

References

External links
 
 
 Enter The Ninja at Facemelting Films

1981 films
1981 martial arts films
American martial arts films
Ninja films
Films set in Metro Manila
Films shot in Metro Manila
Films directed by Menahem Golan
Films shot in the Philippines
Golan-Globus films
Japan in non-Japanese culture
Cockfighting in film
Films produced by Yoram Globus
1980s English-language films
1980s American films